Monique Heinke (born 25 May 1973 in Sydney) is an Australian rower. She competed in the women's quadruple sculls event at the 2000 Summer Olympics and the women's eight event at the 2004 Summer Olympics in Athens.

References

Australian female rowers
Rowers at the 2000 Summer Olympics
Rowers at the 2004 Summer Olympics
Rowers from Sydney
Olympic rowers of Australia
1973 births
Living people